Barney Oldfield's Race for a Life is a 1913 silent comedy short, directed and produced by Mack Sennett and starring Sennett, Mabel Normand, and Barney Oldfield as himself. It is considered one of the earliest to include the plot of a villain tying a young damsel to the tracks of an oncoming locomotive; a holdover from the Gaslight era of Victorian stage melodrama.

Plot
A lady, 'Mabel Sweet and Lovely' is courted by a gentleman, 'A Bashful Suitor'. He offers her a corsage which she accepts. They coyly share a kiss. After the Suitor leaves, the Villain appears and grabs the lady. She hits him and escapes. This angers the Villain and he vows to get his way. At the next opportunity, the Villain once again kidnaps the lady, this time with the help of two henchmen, and chains her to the railway tracks.

The three villains travel by handcar to the station, where they assault two workers and steal a locomotive engine. The villains drive the train back towards the location of Mabel who is still tied to the tracks.

The railyard worker alerts the Suitor about the situation, who then rushes to ask his friend, racecar driver, Barney Oldfield for help.

The two friends jump in the automobile and race the speeding hijacked locomotive to rescue the damsel in distress. Mabel is dramatically saved at the last moment and is carried away to safety. The foiled villain kills his accomplice and shoots five Keystone cops arriving by handcar to arrest him. Finally he turns the gun on himself but upon discovering the bullet chamber empty, he drops dead in a rage.

Cast
 Mabel Normand - Mabel Sweet And Lovely
 Mack Sennett - Bashful Suitor
 Ford Sterling - Villainous Rival
 Hank Mann	- Villain's accomplice
 Barney Oldfield - Himself, a racing driver
 Al St. John - another accomplice of the Villain	
 Helen Holmes - Beauty, talking to Oldfield at Picket Fence		
 William Hauber - Villager
 The Keystone Cops

References

External links
 
 
 

1913 films
1913 comedy films
1913 short films
American auto racing films
Silent American comedy films
American black-and-white films
American silent short films
Films directed by Mack Sennett
American comedy short films
1910s American films